Młoda Liga was the league of men's under-23 volleyball in Poland, for volleyball clubs located in this country. It was overseen by Profesjonalna Liga Piłki Siatkowej S.A. (PLPS S.A.). The regular season was followed by playoffs, with the winner earning the Polish Championship U23. Dissolved in 2017.

Medalists

References

See also 
 Volleyball in Poland
 PlusLiga

 
Volleyball competitions in Poland
Poland
Sports leagues established in 2010